() is a village in the municipality Neu Wulmstorf in the district Harburg in the north east of Lower Saxony, Germany. It is part of the Hamburg Metropolitan Region.

References

Harburg (district)
Villages in Lower Saxony